"Something in My Heart" is a song written by Wayland Patton, and recorded by American country music artist Ricky Skaggs.  It was released in October 1984 as the first single from his album Country Boy.  The song reached #2 on the Billboard Hot Country Singles chart in February 1985 and #1 on the RPM Country Tracks chart in Canada.

Charts

Weekly charts

Year-end charts

References

1984 singles
Ricky Skaggs songs
Song recordings produced by Ricky Skaggs
Epic Records singles
1984 songs
Songs written by Wayland Patton